Prey on Life is the third full-length album from Swedish progressive metal band Burst.

Track listing

Credits
Mixed by Fredrik Reinedahl
Artwork by Aaron Turner

2003 albums
Burst (band) albums
Relapse Records albums
Albums with cover art by Aaron Turner